Ampelocissus is a genus of Vitaceae having 90 or more species found variously in tropical Africa, Asia, Central America, and Oceania. The type species, A. latifolia, was originally treated under its basionym, Vitis latifolia, and was collected from the Indian subcontinent.

Species of Ampelocissus are herbaceous or woody, hermaphroditic or polygamo-dioecious flowering plants with tendrils for climbing. Fruits are grape-like berries having 1-4 seeds. Their diploid chromosomal number is 40 (2n=40).

Species 
Plants of the World Online currently includes:

 Ampelocissus abyssinica (Hochst. ex A.Rich.) Planch.
 Ampelocissus acapulcensis (Kunth) Planch.
 Ampelocissus acetosa (F.Muell.) Planch.
 Ampelocissus aculeata (Span.) Planch.
 Ampelocissus africana (Lour.) Merr.
 Ampelocissus amentacea Ridl.
 Ampelocissus angolensis (Baker) Planch.
 Ampelocissus arachnoidea (Hassk.) Planch.
 Ampelocissus araneosa (Dalzell) Gamble
 Ampelocissus artemisiifolia Planch.
 Ampelocissus ascendiflora Latiff
 Ampelocissus asekii J.Wen, Kiapranis & Lovave
 Ampelocissus banaensis Gagnep.
 Ampelocissus barbata (Wall.) Planch.
 Ampelocissus birii P.Singh & B.V.Shetty
 Ampelocissus bombycina (Baker) Planch.
 Ampelocissus borneensis Merr.
 Ampelocissus botryostachys Planch.
 Ampelocissus butoensis C.L.Li
 Ampelocissus capillaris (Ridl.) Merr.
 Ampelocissus cardiospermoides Planch.
 Ampelocissus celebica Suess.
 Ampelocissus chaffanjonii (H.Lév.) Rehder
 Ampelocissus changensis Craib
 Ampelocissus cinnamomea (Wall.) Planch.
 Ampelocissus complanata Latiff
 Ampelocissus concinna (Baker) Planch.
 Ampelocissus debilis Ridl.
 Ampelocissus dekindtiana Gilg
 Ampelocissus dichrothrix (Miq.) Suess.
 Ampelocissus dissecta (Baker) Planch.
 Ampelocissus divaricata (Wall. ex M.A.Lawson) Planch.
 Ampelocissus dolichobotrys Quisumb. & Merr.
 Ampelocissus edulis (De Wild.) Gilg & M.Brandt
 Ampelocissus elegans Gagnep.
 Ampelocissus elephantina Planch.
 Ampelocissus erdvendbergiana Planch.
 Ampelocissus filipes Planch.
 Ampelocissus floccosa (Ridl.) Galet
 Ampelocissus frutescens Jackes
 Ampelocissus gardineri (F.M.Bailey) Jackes
 Ampelocissus gracilipes Stapf
 Ampelocissus gracilis (Wall.) Planch.
 Ampelocissus harmandii Planch.
 Ampelocissus helferi (M.A.Lawson) Planch.
 Ampelocissus hoabinhensis C.L.Li
 Ampelocissus humulifolia Gagnep.
 Ampelocissus imperialis (Miq.) Planch.
 Ampelocissus indica (L.) Planch.
 Ampelocissus iomalla Gilg & M.Brandt
 Ampelocissus javalensis (Seem.) W.D.Stevens & A.Pool
 Ampelocissus korthalsii Planch.
 Ampelocissus latifolia (Roxb.) Planch.
 Ampelocissus leonensis (Hook.f.) Planch.
 Ampelocissus leptotricha Diels
 Ampelocissus lowii (Hook.f.) Planch.
 Ampelocissus macrocirrha Gilg & M.Brandt
 Ampelocissus madulidii Latiff
 Ampelocissus martini Planch.
 Ampelocissus mesoamericana Lombardi
 Ampelocissus mottleyi (Hook.f.) Planch.
 Ampelocissus muelleriana Planch.
 Ampelocissus multifoliola Merr.
 Ampelocissus multiloba Gilg & M.Brandt
 Ampelocissus multistriata (Baker) Planch.
 Ampelocissus nitida (M.A.Lawson) Planch.
 Ampelocissus obtusata (Welw. ex Baker) Planch.
 Ampelocissus ochracea (Teijsm. & Binn.) Merr.
 Ampelocissus pauciflora Merr.
 Ampelocissus pedicellata Merr.
 Ampelocissus phoenicantha Alston
 Ampelocissus poggei Gilg & M.Brandt
 Ampelocissus polystachya (Wall. ex M.A.Lawson) Planch.
 Ampelocissus polythyrsa (Miq.) Gagnep.
 Ampelocissus pterisanthella (Ridl.) Merr.
 Ampelocissus racemifera (Jack) Planch.
 Ampelocissus robinsonii Planch.
 Ampelocissus rubiginosa Lauterb.
 Ampelocissus rubriflora Gagnep.
 Ampelocissus rugosa (Wall.) Planch.
 Ampelocissus sapinii (De Wild.) Gilg & M.Brandt
 Ampelocissus sarcocephala (Schweinf. ex Oliv.) Planch.
 Ampelocissus schimperiana (Hochst. ex A.Rich.) Planch.
 Ampelocissus sikkimensis (M.A.Lawson) Planch.
 Ampelocissus spicifer (Griff.) Planch.
 Ampelocissus tenuis Merr.
 Ampelocissus thyrsiflora (Blume) Planch.
 Ampelocissus tomentosa (Roth) Planch.
 Ampelocissus trichoclada Quisumb. & Merr.
 Ampelocissus verschuerenii De Wild.
 Ampelocissus wightiana B.V.Shetty & Par.Singh
 Ampelocissus winkleri Lauterb.
 Ampelocissus xizangensis C.L.Li

Gallery

References

 
Vitaceae genera
Taxa named by Jules Émile Planchon